Kerry Grant is an Australian sprint canoer who competed in the late 1980s. He won a bronze medal in the K-2 1000 m event at the 1986 ICF Canoe Sprint World Championships in Montreal, Quebec, Canada.

References

Australian male canoeists
Living people
Year of birth missing (living people)
ICF Canoe Sprint World Championships medalists in kayak
20th-century Australian people